Paraguayan Hammock is a 2006 Paraguayan drama film directed by Paz Encina. It was screened in the Un Certain Regard section at the 2006 Cannes Film Festival.

Cast
 Ramon Del Rio as Ramón
 Georgina Genes as Cándida

References

External links

2006 films
2006 drama films
Argentine drama films
Guaraní-language films
Indigenous cinema in Latin America
Films shot in Paraguay
Films based on actual events
Chaco War films
Paraguayan drama films
2000s Argentine films